Allen Richardson (28 October 1926 – 20 September 1998) was an English first-class cricketer active 1948–52 who played for Nottinghamshire. He was born in Woodbeck; died in Sherwood.

References

1926 births
1998 deaths
English cricketers
Nottinghamshire cricketers
People from Bassetlaw District
People from Sherwood, Nottingham
Cricketers from Nottinghamshire